The Peruvian racket-tail (Ocreatus peruanus) is a species of hummingbird in the "brilliants", tribe Heliantheini in subfamily Lesbiinae.  It is found in Ecuador and  Peru.

Taxonomy and systematics

The Peruvian racket-tail, as defined by the International Ornithological Committee (IOC) and the Clements taxonomy, is one of three species in genus Ocreatus. However, BirdLife International's Handbook of the Birds of the World (HBW) treats the taxon as one of eight subspecies of booted racket-tail (O. underwoodii). The IOC and Clements call underwoodii "white-booted racket-tail" and assign five subspecies to it. The South American Classification Committee of the American Ornithological Society (SACC) follows the eight-subspecies model of booted racket-tail but has requested a proposal to elevate O. puruanus and two other subspecies to species status.

Description

All racket-tails have pronounced sexual dimorphism. Only the male has elongated outer rectrices (tail feathers) that have bare shafts with terminal flags. On the Peruvian racket-tail, those feathers are straight and do not cross; the flags are narrow ovals that slightly overlap. Both sexes have greenish upperparts without a glittering forehead, both have a white spot behind the eye, and both have cinnamon leg puffs. Males have a greenish gray throat and a solid green belly. Their tail flags are greenish black. Females have a white throat and breast heavily spotted with green.

Distribution and habitat

The Peruvian racket-tail is found in eastern Ecuador and northeastern Peru as far as Huánuco Department. It inhabits the temperate and subtropical Andes. It favors the edges of humid to wet forest but is also found in the forest interior and in more open secondary forest.

Behavior

Movement

The Peruvian racket-tail makes seasonal elevational movements after breeding.

Feeding

It takes nectar from a variety of plants such as those of genera Palicourea, Clusia, Inga, and Cavendishia. Often several birds will feed close together. In addition to feeding on nectar it captures small insects by hawking from a perch.

Breeding

The Peruvian racket-tail's breeding season has not been studied but might include most of the year. The female incubates the clutch of two eggs for 16 to 17 days; fledging occurs 19 to 22 days after hatch.

Vocalization

Both male and female Peruvian racket-tails give "a diagnostic, descending, thin sweet trill, 'ti-tlee-ee-ee' [and] single 'tsit' and 'trrt' notes."

Status

The IUCN follows HBW taxonomy and so recognizes only one species of Ocreatus as the booted racket-tail. It has assessed the species as being of Least Concern. It has a large range, and though its population size is not known it is believed to be stable. No immediate threats are known. The racket-tail complex as a whole is very common and occurs in several protected areas.

References

Peruvian racket-tail
Birds of the Peruvian Andes
Peruvian racket-tail
Peruvian racket-tail